Honam University is a university located in Gwangsan-gu, South Korea.

External links
Honam University

References 

Gwangsan District
Seo District, Gwangju
Private universities and colleges in South Korea
Honam University
Educational institutions established in 1978
1978 establishments in South Korea